The 1991–92 Scottish Challenge Cup was the second season of the competition, which was also known as the B&Q Cup for sponsorship reasons. It was competed for by the 26 clubs in the Scottish Football League Division One and Two. The defending champions were Dundee, who defeated Ayr United 3–2 after extra time in the 1990 final.

The final was played on 8 December 1991, between Ayr United and Hamilton Academical at Fir Park, Motherwell. Hamilton Academical won 1–0, to win the tournament for the first time.

Schedule

First round
Kilmarnock, Morton, Queen of the South, Queen's Park, Raith Rovers and Stirling Albion entered the second round.

Source: SFL

Second round 

Source: SFL

Quarter-finals

Semi-finals

Final

References

External links 
 statto.com Scottish Challenge Cup fixtures and results on statto.com
 Scottish Football League Scottish Challenge Cup on Scottish Football League website
 Soccerbase Scottish League Challenge Cup on Soccerbase.com
 ESPN Soccernet  Scottish League Challenge Cup homepage on ESPN Soccernet
 BBC Sport – Scottish Cups Challenge Cup on BBC Sport

Scottish Challenge Cup seasons
Challenge Cup
Scottish Challenge Cup